The Ministry of Labour and Social Protection of Moldova is one of the fourteen ministries of the Government of Moldova.

Ministers of Labour and Social Protection

References

Health, Labour and Social Protection
Moldova
Moldova
Moldova